Xylitol is a chemical compound with the formula , or HO(CH2)(CHOH)3(CH2)OH; specifically, one particular stereoisomer with that structural formula. It is a colorless or white crystalline solid that is freely soluble in water. It can be classified as a polyalcohol  and a sugar alcohol, specifically an alditol.

Xylitol is used as a food additive and sugar substitute.  Its European Union code number is E967. Replacing sugar with xylitol in food products may promote better dental health, but evidence is lacking on whether xylitol itself prevents dental cavities.

History
Emil Fischer, a German chemistry professor, and his assistant Rudolf Stahel isolated a new compound from beech wood chips in September 1890 and named it Xylit, the German word for xylitol. The following year, the French chemist M.G. Bertrand isolated xylitol syrup by processing wheat and oat straw. Sugar rationing during World War II led to an interest in sugar substitutes. Interest in xylitol and other polyols became intense, leading to their characterization and manufacturing methods.

Structure, production, commerce
Xylitol occurs naturally in small amounts in plums, strawberries, cauliflower, and pumpkin; humans and many other animals make trace amounts during metabolism of carbohydrates. Unlike most sugar alcohols, xylitol is achiral. Most other isomers of pentane-1,2,3,4,5-pentol are chiral, but xylitol has a plane of symmetry.

Industrial production starts with lignocellulosic biomass from which xylan is extracted; raw biomass materials include hardwoods, softwoods, and agricultural waste from processing maize, wheat, or rice. The xylan polymers can be hydrolyzed into xylose, which is catalytically hydrogenated into xylitol. The conversion changes the sugar (xylose, an aldehyde) into the primary alcohol, xylitol. Impurities are then removed.

The mixture is often processed by standard industrial methods; industrial fermentation involving bacteria, fungi, or yeast, especially Candida tropicalis, are common, but are not as efficient.

According to the US Department of Energy, xylitol production by fermentation from discarded biomass is one of the most valuable renewable chemicals for commerce, forecast to be a US$1.4 billion industry by 2025.

Uses
Xylitol is used as a sugar substitute in such manufactured products as drugs, dietary supplements, confections, toothpaste, and chewing gum, but is not a common household sweetener. Xylitol has negligible effects on blood sugar because its assimilation and metabolism are independent of insulin. It is approved as a food additive in the United States and elsewhere.

Xylitol is also found as an additive to saline solution for nasal irrigation and has been reported to be effective in improving symptoms of chronic sinusitis.

Food properties

Nutrition, taste, and cooking
Humans absorb xylitol more slowly than sucrose, and xylitol supplies 40% fewer calories than an equal mass of sucrose.

Xylitol has about the same sweetness as sucrose, but is sweeter than similar compounds like sorbitol and mannitol.

Xylitol is stable enough to be used in baking, but because xylitol and other polyols are more heat-stable, they do not caramelise as sugars do. When used in foods, they lower the freezing point of the mixture.

Food risks
No serious health risk exists in most humans for normal levels of consumption. The European Food Safety Authority has not set a limit on daily intake of xylitol. Due to the adverse laxative effect that all polyols have on the digestive system in high doses, xylitol is banned from soft drinks in the European Union. Similarly due to a 1985 report, by the E.U. Scientific Committee on Food, stating that "ingesting 50 g a day of xylitol can cause diarrhea", tabletop sweeteners, as well as other products containing xylitol are required to display the warning: "Excessive consumption may induce laxative effects".

Metabolism
Xylitol has 2.4 kilocalories of food energy per gram of xylitol (10 kilojoules per gram) according to U.S. and E.U. food-labeling regulations. The real value can vary, depending on metabolic factors.

Primarily, the liver metabolizes absorbed xylitol. The main metabolic route in humans occurs in cytoplasm, via nonspecific NAD-dependent dehydrogenase (polyol dehydrogenase), which transforms xylitol to D-xylulose. Specific xylulokinase phosphorylates it to D-xylulose-5-phosphate. This then goes to pentose phosphate pathway for further processing.

About 50% of eaten xylitol is absorbed via the intestines. Of the remaining 50% that is not absorbed by the intestines, in humans, 50–75% of the xylitol remaining in the gut is fermented by gut bacteria into short-chain organic acids and gases, which may produce flatulence. The remnant unabsorbed xylitol that escapes fermentation is excreted unchanged, mostly in feces; less than 2 g of xylitol out of every 100 g ingested is excreted via urine.

Xylitol ingestion also increases motilin secretion, which may be related to xylitol's ability to cause diarrhea. The less-digestible but fermentable nature of xylitol also contributes to constipation relieving effects.

Health effects

Dental care
Research has identified carbohydrates, oral bacteria, tooth anatomy, along with their time of interaction as the main pathobiological etiology for dental caries. Sucrose is deemed to be the most cariogenic carbohydrate consumed by humans, as it is a substrate for various oral bacteria to produce insoluble polysaccharides and acid. Streptococcus mutans  a major pathological bacterium  synthesises polysaccharides (glucans) from sucrose to adhere to tooth surfaces. The resultant thick plaque becomes anaerobic and plaque bacteria ferment sugars to produce an acidic environment, dissolving the outer tooth enamel.

Xylitol, a sugar alcohol containing 5 carbon-polyol, is metabolized via the phospho-enolpyruvate-phospho-transferase pathway in S. mutans, which produces xylitol-5-phosphate as a product. Xylitol-5-phosphate competes with phosphofructokinase and therefore results in inhibition of glycolysis via accumulation of glucose-6-phosphate. Over long periods of xylitol use, S. mutans alters its enzymatic activity.

Chewing gums containing xylitol and sorbitol may affect caries development. Xylitol-containing chewing gums displayed anticariogenic properties in all protocols, but it was unclear whether this effect was due to increased saliva flow. A Cochrane review suggested a positive anticariogenic effect of xylitol-containing fluoride toothpastes when compared to fluoride-only toothpaste, but there was insufficient evidence to determine whether other xylitol-containing products can prevent caries in infants, children or adults.

Earache
In 2011 EFSA "concluded that there was not enough evidence to support" the claim that xylitol-sweetened gum could prevent middle-ear infections with a fast onset, which is also known as acute otitis media (AOM). A 2016 review indicated that xylitol in chewing gum or a syrup may have a moderate effect in preventing AOM in healthy children. It may be an alternative to conventional therapies (such as antibiotics) to lower risk of earache in healthy children – reducing risk of occurrence by 25% – although there is no definitive proof that it could be used as a therapy for earache.

Diabetes
In 2011, EFSA approved a marketing claim that foods or beverages containing xylitol or similar sugar replacers cause lower blood glucose and lower insulin responses compared to sugar-containing foods or drinks. Xylitol products are used as sucrose substitutes for weight control, as xylitol has 40% fewer calories than sucrose (2.4 kcal/g compared to 4.0 kcal/g for sucrose). The glycemic index (GI) of xylitol is only 7% of the GI for glucose.

Adverse effects

Humans
When ingested at high doses, xylitol and other polyols may cause gastrointestinal discomfort, including flatulence, diarrhea, and irritable bowel syndrome (see Metabolism above); some people experience the adverse effects at lower doses. Xylitol has a lower laxation threshold than some sugar alcohols but is more easily tolerated than mannitol and sorbitol.

Increased xylitol consumption can increase oxalate, calcium, and phosphate excretion to urine (termed oxaluria, calciuria, and phosphaturia, respectively). These are known risk factors for kidney stone disease, but despite that, xylitol has not been linked to kidney disease in humans.

Dogs and other animals
Xylitol is poisonous to dogs. Ingesting 100 milligrams of xylitol per kilogram of body weight (mg/kg bw) causes dogs to experience a dose-dependent insulin release; depending on the dose it can result in life-threatening hypoglycemia. Hypoglycemic symptoms of xylitol toxicity may arise as quickly as 30 to 60 minutes after ingestion. Vomiting is a common first symptom, which can be followed by tiredness and ataxia. At doses above 500 mg/kg bw, liver failure is likely and may result in coagulopathies like disseminated intravascular coagulation.

Xylitol is safe for rhesus macaques, horses, and rats. 

A 2018 study suggests that xylitol is safe in cats in doses of up to 1000 mg/kg; however, this study was performed on only 6 cats, and should not be considered definitive.

See also

 Aspartame
 Birch sap
 L-Xylulose reductase
 Xylonic acid

References

External links

E-number additives
Excipients
Sugar alcohols
Sugar substitutes
Veterinary toxicology